Yokefleet (also known as Yorkfleet)  is a hamlet in the East Riding of Yorkshire, England. It forms part of the civil parish of Blacktoft and a very small part of the civil parish of Laxton. It is situated on the north bank of the River Ouse, downstream from York, Selby and Goole.

Yokefleet lies within the Parliamentary constituency of Haltemprice and Howden an area that mainly consists of middle class suburbs, towns and villages. The area is affluent, placed as the 10th most affluent in the country in a Barclays Private Clients survey,  and has one of the highest proportions of owner-occupiers in the country.

Yokefleet Hall is a Grade II listed mansion house of Victorian design by architect Cuthbert Brodrick. The hall is on the eastern edge of the hamlet and the current house was built between 1868 and 1874 according to the York Georgian Society.

History
Yokefleet is one of the ancient manors mentioned in the Domesday Book of 1086. The original Manor House was located on a moated site in the hamlet.

In 1823 Yokefleet had a population of 199, which included a yeoman farmer, a corn miller, and a cattle dealer. It contained a windmill which served "as a mark for sailors to navigate the river". The land mainly belonged to the Empson family who were impropriators—lay persons as patrons of incumbent clergy. There was a Wesleyan chapel. Occupations by this time included seven farmers, a school teacher for the local school, a corn miller, tailor, and two shoemakers, one of whom was a shopkeeper. A descendant of the Empson family, born at Yokefleet Hall, was literary critic and poet Sir William Empson (1906 – 1984).

Prince Philip named his horse after Yokefleet and was seen having trouble controlling the horse at Horse Guards Parade, London in 1953. 

In early December 2013 Yokefleet, among other regional settlements was subject to flooding due to a tidal surge on the Ouse the largest in 60 years. According to the Environment Agency, damage caused would have been worse had it not been for the flood defences in place across the region. A 2014 Flood Investigation Report from East Riding of Yorkshire Council recommended that affected property owners should "develop a personal flood plan". However, improved flood defences are likely to be introduced across the region, including the significant raising of the river bank in order to ensure such flooding does not reoccur. The Environment Agency expressed confidence in such flood defences being improved by the government in order to prevent further flooding in the Haltemprice and Howden constituency and across the East Riding of Yorkshire.

Gallery

Notable people
 Sir William Empson – Literary critic and poet

References

External links

Hamlets in the East Riding of Yorkshire
Cuthbert Brodrick buildings